The Agdenes Lighthouse or Ringflua is a lighthouse on the Trondheimsfjord in the municipality of Orkland in Trøndelag county, Norway. The lighthouse sits just offshore at a 90 degree bend in the fjord which leads to the city of Trondheim. The old lighthouse sits on the shore, just a short distance from the present light. The lighthouse is only accessible by boat.

History
The original lighthouse building was built in 1804 near the shore of the Trondheimsfjord. That building was rebuilt in 1828. In 1984, the old building was closed and a new light was built on Ringflua, a tiny rock in the fjord, just off the shoreline. The reason that the new light was built just offshore was to make it more visible since the old light was blocked from certain directions.

It has an occulting light that blinks white, red, and green over an eight-second period.

See also

 List of lighthouses in Norway
 Lighthouses in Norway

References

External links
 Norsk Fyrhistorisk Forening 

Lighthouses completed in 1804
Lighthouses completed in 1984
Orkland
Lighthouses in Trøndelag
1804 establishments in Norway